Canary Wharf is a London Underground station at Canary Wharf and is on the Jubilee line, between  and  stations. The station is located in Travelcard Zone 2 and was opened on 17 September 1999 as part of the Jubilee Line Extension. Over 40 million people pass through the station each year, making it second busiest on the London Underground outside Central London after Stratford, and also the busiest that serves only a single line.

History
Before the arrival of the Jubilee line, London's Docklands had suffered from relatively poor public transport. Although the Docklands Light Railway station at Canary Wharf had been operating since 1987, by 1990 it was obvious that the DLR's capacity would soon be reached. The Jubilee line's routing through Canary Wharf was intended to relieve some of this pressure.

The tube station was intended from the start to be the showpiece of the Jubilee Line Extension, and the contract for its design was awarded in 1990 to the architect Sir Norman Foster. It was constructed, by a Tarmac Construction / Bachy UK Joint Venture, in a drained arm of the former dock, using a simple "cut and cover" method to excavate an enormous pit 24 metres (78 ft) deep and 265 metres (869 ft) long. The size of the interior has led to it being compared to a cathedral, and it has even been used to celebrate a wedding. Foster based the design upon previous work done for the Bilbao metro, colloquially named "Fosteritos". However, the main reason for the station's enormous dimensions was the great number of passengers predicted; as many as 50,000 daily. It remains the only tube station to accommodate rush hour demand. These predictions have been outgrown, with as many as 69,759 on weekdays recorded in 2006 and within a decade it had become the only station, outside of Zone 1 to be ranked within the top-ten most used stations.

Canary Wharf station and the Jubilee line Extension itself were partly funded by the owners of the Canary Wharf complex, to make it more accessible to commuters. The Canary Wharf group had committed to £500 million of funding for the capital costs, over 24 years. They were, however, underwhelmed by the proposed service frequency. Only five years after the construction of the extension, capacity issues started becoming apparent and upgrades were required. The first step was the lengthening of the trains from 6 to 7 cars. This was done at the end of 2005.  The second step was to replace the conventional Jubilee line signalling with the Thales S40 moving-block system.  This was eventually introduced into service during 2011 after many delays and teething problems and allows a more intensive timetable to operate with 30 trains per hour running in the peaks.

In a 2013 poll conducted by YouGov, it was voted as the "Most Loved" tube station in London and  "despite its immense volume [it is] comfortable and inviting". Five years after opening, a study concluded that the new station had increased land values by £2 billion.

In January 2019, a person died after falling from an escalator; this led to the station being temporarily closed.

The station today

Above ground there is little sign of the vast interior: two curved glass canopies at the east and west ends of the station cover the entrances and allow daylight into the ticket hall below. The Jubilee Park, a public park is situated between the two canopies, above the station concourse. It had originally been intended that the infilled section of the dock would be reinstated above the station, but this proved impractical because of technical difficulties and the park was created instead.

As with the other below-ground stations on the Jubilee Line extension, both station platforms are equipped with platform screen doors. There are 20 escalators and 3 lifts serving the 2 platforms.

Canary Wharf station has become one of the busiest stations on the network, serving the ever-expanding Canary Wharf business district. Although it shares its name with the Docklands Light Railway station at Canary Wharf, the two are not directly integrated (in fact, Heron Quays DLR station is nearer at street level). Initially, a direct interchange between the DLR had been hoped for, but development in the intervening years had prevented this goal. All three stations are connected underground via shopping malls. Out-of-station interchange within twenty minutes between any two of the stations entails no additional charge.

Canary Wharf can be used to reverse trains from both the east and the west. A scissors crossover west of the station allows trains from Stanmore to enter either the east- or west-bound platform at the station, and trains from Stratford enter the normal westbound platform and can use this scissors crossover to reverse back towards Stratford.

Services and connections
The station is located on the Jubilee line between Canada Water and North Greenwich in Travelcard Zone 2. The typical off-peak service, in trains per hour (tph) is:
18tph eastbound to Stratford
12tph westbound to Stanmore
6tph westbound to Wembley Park

Night Tube services, running on Friday and Saturday nights, were introduced in October 2016. Trains run every 10 minutes on the entire line.
 6 tph Stanmore – Stratford

Future proposals
Canary Wharf Group (CWG) has called for the Bakerloo line extension to Lewisham to be diverted to Surrey Quays and Canary Wharf from Old Kent Road, before running to Charlton, CWG suggest the current Jubilee Line not being able to cope with demand from the yet to be approved new Canada Water scheme.
CWG has also proposed a new underground line between Euston and Canary Wharf which is being considered by the government.

In popular culture

On 9 January 2013, the station appeared on a £1.28 British postage stamp as part of a set commemorating the 150th anniversary of the first London underground train journey.  The stamp's captions read "Jubilee Line at Canary Wharf" and "1999". The Canary Wharf stamp represented the most modern phase of the Underground in the set of six stamps.

The station was used as a filming location for some scenes of Danny Boyle's 2002 film 28 Days Later. In April 2016, Canary Wharf station was used as a filming location for an Imperial base in the Star Wars film Rogue One. The location shoot took place between midnight and 4 am, when the station was closed to the public, and was commented on by Star Wars fans using Twitter.

Connections 
London Buses routes 135, 277, D7 and night routes N277 and N550 serve the tube station.

Gallery

See also
Canary Wharf DLR station
Canary Wharf railway station

Notes and references

Notes

References

External links

 Construction of the Station's Entrance Canopies
 More photographs of Canary Wharf station

Canary Wharf
Canary Wharf buildings
Jubilee line stations
London Underground Night Tube stations
Transport architecture in London
Tube stations in the London Borough of Tower Hamlets
Foster and Partners buildings
Railway stations in Great Britain opened in 1999